Maurice Neville Hill FRS (29 May 1919 – 11 January 1966) was a British marine geophysicist.

Background
Hill was the son of Nobel Prize–winning physiologist Archibald Vivian Hill and his wife Margaret Hill, the daughter of John Neville Keynes and sister of John Maynard Keynes.  His sister was Polly Hill and his brother the biophysicist David Keynes Hill.

He was educated at Byron House, Highgate School and King's College, Cambridge, where he took his PhD and was a Fellow from 1949 and Director of Studies in Natural Sciences from 1961. In 1965 he became Reader in Marine Geophysics at the Department of Geodesy and Geophysics at Cambridge.

In 1944 he married Philippa Pass, daughter of Douglas Pass, and they had two sons and three daughters, including Julia Riley and Mark Hill.

Awards and honours
He was elected FRAS in 1951 and FGS in 1953. He was elected a Fellow of the Royal Society in 1962. He was awarded the Charles Chree Medal and Prize in 1963.

References

1919 births
1966 deaths
Fellows of the Royal Society
People educated at Highgate School
Alumni of King's College, Cambridge
Fellows of King's College, Cambridge
Keynes family
British geophysicists
Place of birth missing
Place of death missing
People educated at Byron House School
Marine geophysicists